Fascicular block may refer to:

 Left anterior fascicular block
 Left posterior fascicular block
 Bifascicular block
 Trifascicular block